Michael Addamo (born 1994) is an Australian professional poker player from Melbourne. He is a four-time World Series of Poker (WSOP) bracelet winner.

Addamo was a chess player as a teenager and reached a career-high rating of 1930 in 2013. He studied to be an actuary.

Addamo began playing poker in 2012. His first WSOP cashes came in 2016, including a third-place finish in a $1,500 No Limit Hold'em event. He won his first bracelet at the 2018 WSOP in the $2,620 Marathon No Limit Hold'em event, defeating a field of 1,637 players for $653,000. Later that year, he added another bracelet at the WSOP Europe, winning the €25,500 Super High Roller for €848,000. 

Addamo won two more bracelets at the 2021 WSOP. First, he won the $50,000 No Limit Hold'em High Roller for $1,132,968. He then won another bracelet in the $100,000 No Limit Hold'em High Roller on the final day of the series, earning $1,958,569.

Playing under the name imluckbox, Addamo won a World Championship of Online Poker event in 2019. In June 2020, he was runner-up to Justin Bonomo in the Super High Roller Bowl Online for $1,187,500, his largest career cash.

At the 2021 Poker Masters, Addamo won the final two events on consecutive days, including the $100,000 Main Event for $1,160,000, and earned the Purple Jacket as series champion.

As of October 2022, Addamo has $20.8 million in career tournament cashes.

World Series of Poker bracelets

References

External links
Hendon Mob profile
WSOP.com profile

1994 births
Australian poker players
World Series of Poker bracelet winners
People from Melbourne
Living people